Ultimate Circus is Nightmare's debut studio album. This album came in two versions, the regular version (as pictured), and another one in a black slip case. It peaked at #115 in the Oricon Charts.

Most of the songs have a heavy rock element, with the exception of 'Mind Ocean' and 'Aquaria', which are slower rock ballads to balance out the album. The album includes their major label debut single, Believe, as well as their triple A-side single, /HATE/Over.

Track listing

Single Information
Believe 
Released: August 21, 2003
Oricon Chart Peak Position: #24
 / HATE / Over
Released: November 21, 2003
Oricon Chart Peak Position: #25

References

Nightmare (Japanese band) albums
2003 debut albums